This is a list of unbeaten football club seasons.

Men's football

(National top division only, minimum 18 matches in league calendar)

Africa

Asia
(National top division only, minimum 18 matches in league calendar)

Europe
AC MilanUnder manager Fabio Capello, AC Milan went undefeated throughout all of their 34 matches in the league to capture the 1991–92 Serie A, and went unbeaten between 1991 and 1993, an Italian record of 58 league matches in total.

ArsenalArsenal won the 2003–04 Premier League title, finishing undefeated under manager Arsene Wenger, and went unbeaten for a total of 49 consecutive matches in the league between 2003 and 2004.

JuventusUnder manager Antonio Conte, Juventus won undefeated the 2011–12 Serie A, becoming the first team to do so in a 38–game league season in Italy. Overall, in that season the team set a national record of 42 official matches unbeaten including the Italian Cup campaign, in which they reached the final. Finally, Juventus went unbeaten during 49 league matches since September 2011 to November 2012.

CelticCeltic completed the domestic 2016–17 season unbeaten in 47 league and cup games, winning the Scottish Premiership, Scottish Cup and Scottish League Cup for an unprecedented unbeaten domestic Treble under manager Brendan Rodgers. Their domestic unbeaten run continued into the 2017–18 season and eventually reached 69 games, before they lost 4–0 to Hearts on 17 December 2017.

Asia

Esteghlal FC

Iranian football team 
This team won the Premier League of the Persian Gulf in 2021-2022 without losing.
This team, with the help of its own coach, player and legend, Farhad Majidi, was able to achieve this championship and become the most proud team in the history of the Premier League of the Persian Gulf.
Of course, the Esteghlal team has been the third most proud team of the Asian continent in the past by winning 2 championships and four runners-up in Asia
Table



(National top division only, minimum 18 matches in league calendar)

South America

North America, Central America and Caribbean

Oceania
(National top division only, minimum 18 matches in league calendar)

Women's football 

(National top division only, minimum 18 matches in league calendar)

See also 
Perfect season
Longest unbeaten runs

References

Association football-related lists
Association football club records and statistics